Augustin Přeučil (3 July 1914 – 14 April 1947) was a Czechoslovakian military pilot, who during World War II worked as an intelligence agent for Nazi Germany. In 1941, whilst serving with the British Royal Air Force, he stole a fighter aircraft from England, and flew it to Occupied Europe where he surrendered it to the German authorities. He later worked in Occupied Central Europe with the Gestapo. Shortly after the war he was executed in Prague by the Czechoslovakian authorities for treason.

Early life
Přeučil was born on 3 July 1914 in the village Třebsín in Benešov, Central Bohemia. At the age of 21 he enrolled at the Civil Aviation School, from which he was conscripted into Czechoslovakian Army for military service, which sent him to train as a pilot at the Military Aviation School in Prostějov. In 1939, on the outbreak of World War II he was serving as a reconnaissance pilot in Air Regiment 6 of the Czechoslovak Air Force.

Agent for Nazi Germany in World War II
When the armed forces of Nazi Germany invaded Czechoslovakia in March 1939 Přeučil attempted to illegally cross the border from the Protectorate of Bohemia and Moravia seeking to leave the country and emigrate to South America, but he was arrested by German officials, and whilst imprisoned recruited as a secret agent by the Gestapo (the officer who recruited him was Oskar Fleischer), who trained him in espionage. He was subsequently freed  and sent on an espionage mission with orders to join the emigre Czechoslovakian military diaspora that was fleeing their country after its occupation to Western Europe, particularly seeking to fall into the company of any groups of air force personnel, and report back to Germany on their activities.

After a brief period in Poland, Přeučil, in company with a group of nearly 200 other Czechoslovakian military personnel, travelled to France in August 1939 intending to enlist with the French Army's Foreign Legion. However, on arrival there the outbreak of World War II led to the French Government ordering all trained Czechoslovakian aircrew that it was aware of in its territory, who were volunteering to enlist with the French Armed Forces to fight Nazi Germany, to be sent to Chartres to train for service with the French Air Force. On arrival, Přeučil received flight training on the Morane-Saulnier, and reported intelligence information on the French Air Force back to the German intelligence via Reich agents operating in France. After the fall of France he was evacuated to the United Kingdom in June 1940, where he joined a newly created Czechoslovak squadron of the Royal Air Force.

In England, Přeučil served in a number of non-combat training and maintenance squadrons of R.A.F., and in July 1941 he even married an English woman. Working with the R.A.F. as an Eastern European fighter pilot-instructor in late 1941, he was attached to No. 55 Operational Training Unit, based at RAF Usworth near Sunderland. On 18 September 1941 Přeučil took off from Unsworth's airfield in Hawker Hurricane type MK IIa, Serial number W9147, and flew out over the North Sea in company with another Hurricane flown by a trainee Polish pilot to practise air-combat tactics. Whilst engaged in the manoeuvres Přeučil reported over the radio that his aircraft was out of control, and breaking away into the clouds, flew the aeroplane to Occupied Europe, landing in the countryside near Bastogne, Belgium. He was taken by local Belgian civilians as a downed R.A.F. pilot, who sheltered him, and handed him over to members of the Belgian Resistance, but Přeučil soon afterwards handed himself into the  German authorities in the vicinity, betraying the locals who had sheltered him to the Gestapo, who arrested them.

At the time of Přeučil's disappearance the R.A.F. assumed he had crashed and died at sea. It was not until the Belgian Resistance reported to London the incident of his arrival in their territory, and behaviour which had cost the lives of two Belgians who had been executed by the Gestapo, that the true circumstances of his disappearance over the North Sea became apparent to the British authorities.

In September 1941, having been debriefed by the Abwehr with all the information about the British military that he had to give, and been generously financially rewarded for his actions, Přeučil returned to Czechoslovakia, and for the remainder of the war he acted as an undercover agent for the Gestapo there, infiltrating and betraying to them Czech Resistance movements. From March 1943 to May 1944 he also infiltrated the concentration camp of Theresienstadt where, posing as a captured Czech R.A.F. pilot, he gathered information on Czech political prisoners and spied on American prisoners of war. In 1944 he was reportedly working for the Gestapo in Prague, and assisted the Wehrmacht in interrogating captured Eastern European Royal Air Force aircrews who had been shot down over occupied Europe.

Post-war trial and execution
On 19 May 1945, eleven days after the fall of Nazi Germany, Přeučil was arrested in Prague as a known Gestapo agent. He was at first tried by military court, but his case was referred to the civilian People's Court in Prague. After two years of investigation he was tried by Chief Public Prosecutor Jaroslav Drábek on 3 March 1947 on charges of High Treason against Czechoslovakia, found guilty and sentenced to death. He was executed at the age of 32 by hanging at Pankrác Prison on 14 April 1947.

References

1914 births
1947 deaths
Royal Air Force personnel of World War II
Czechoslovak Air Force officers
Czechoslovak military personnel of World War II
Czechoslovak defectors
Czech World War II pilots
Executed Czechoslovak collaborators with Nazi Germany
People executed by Czechoslovakia by hanging
People executed for spying for Nazi Germany